Estadio Municipal de Chapín is a multi-purpose stadium in Jerez, Spain. It is currently used mostly for football matches and is the home ground of
Xerez Deportivo FC. Xerez Deportivo are the current tenants and Xerez CD former tenants. The stadium holds 20,523 and it was built in 1988.

Remodeling 

In 2002, the stadium was remodeled to hold the 2002 FEI World Equestrian Games. The whole grandstand was covered with roof, and a hotel and spa-gym was added.

External links 
Estadios de Espana 

Chapin
Xerez CD
Chapin
Chapin
Buildings and structures in Jerez de la Frontera
Sports venues completed in 1988
Sports venues in Andalusia
Sport in Jerez de la Frontera